Suzanne Robert (1948 – June 3, 2007) was a Quebec writer.

She was born in Montreal and received a BA from the Collège Jésus-Marie d'Outremont and a master's degree in biological anthropology from the Université de Montréal. From 1984 to 1999, she was a member of the management committee for the magazine Liberté. Robert was also literary commentator for Radio Canada for a number of years. She was director for the "Fictions" collection of the Éditions de l'Hexagone publishing house. Her short stories were also included in various anthologies.

Works 
 La dame morte (1973)
 Les trois soeurs de personne, novel (1980)
 Vulpera (1983), shortlisted for the Governor General's Award for French-language fiction
 À proximité, stories (1987)
 L'Autre, l'une (1987), with Diane-Monique Daviau

References 

1948 births
2007 deaths
Canadian women non-fiction writers
Canadian novelists in French
Canadian short story writers in French
Journalists from Montreal
Canadian women novelists
Canadian women short story writers
Writers from Montreal
Université de Montréal alumni
20th-century Canadian women writers
20th-century Canadian novelists
20th-century Canadian short story writers